The Piedmontese Easter (Italian: Pasque piemontesi, French: Pâques piémontaises or Pâques vaudoises) was a series of massacres on Waldensians (also known as Waldenses or Vaudois) by Savoyard troops in the Duchy of Savoy in 1655.

Background 

Alexis Muston, a 19th-century French Protestant pastor based in Bordeaux, claimed in L'Israel des Alpes (Paris 1852) that neither Duke Charles Emmanuel II of Savoy nor the Waldensians themselves had sought to wage war, and both parties were content with maintaining the peace. It was due to the constant pressure exerted by New Council of Propagation of the Faith and the Extermination of Heresy (Concilium Novum de Propaganda Fide et Extirpandis Haereticis), an institution of the Roman Catholic Church established in Turin in 1650, that regularly convened in the palace of the Archbishop of Turin.

Although the Waldensian population (numbering around 15,000 in 1685) in certain areas of Piedmont had held privileges of tolerance and freedom of belief and conscience for centuries that were written down in several documents, these long-established rights for Protestant Italians were being violated by new decrees passed by Andrea Gastaldo, member of the Council. Two decrees in particular threatened the continued existence of Waldensian communities in Piedmont: the Edict of 15 May 1650, abrogating the old Waldensian privileges, and the Edict of 25 January 1655, which was in fact a religious expulsion order:

Events 
The Waldensian refusal to obey the Edict of 25 January 1655 led the government to send troops to plunder and burn Waldensian houses, and to station over 15,000 soldiers in their valleys. The Savoyard army consisted of local soldiers, as well as French and Irish troops, under the command of the Marquis of Pianezza.

On 24 April 1655, the Piedmontese Easter Massacre commenced: a massacre of thousands of Waldensian civilians (4,000 to 6,000 according to one estimate) was committed by ducal troops.

This caused a mass exodus of Waldensian refugees to the Valley of Perosa (Pérouse), and led to the formation of rebel groups under the leadership of Joshua Janavel, Jean Léger and Bartolomeo Jahier, whilst several states including England, France, Germany and the Protestant cantons of Switzerland attempted to intervene diplomatically. On 18 August, the Pinerolo Declaration of Mercy was issued, which constituted a peace treaty between Charles Emmanuel II and the Waldensians.

Estimates of how many Waldensians were killed during the Piedmontese Easter vary widely, including "more than a thousand", "4,000 to 6,000", and "6,000".

Impact 
Reports from the massacres spread quickly throughout Protestant Europe, sparking outrage, especially in Britain. Lord Protector Oliver Cromwell threatened the Duchy of Savoy with intervention, somewhat shaping the military decisions made by the Duke. English poet John Milton was inspired to write the sonnet "On the Late Massacre in Piedmont".

References 

Persecution of the Waldensians
History of Savoy
1655 in Italy
Massacres in Italy
European wars of religion
Persecution of Christian heretics
Easter